A Strange Education is the debut album from the Scottish indie rock band The Cinematics. The album was released by TVT Records on 5 March 2007 in the United Kingdom and a day later in the United States.

Promotion
The album was promoted by two singles. The lead single, "Chase" appeared on the Transporter 2 soundtrack. The video for The Cinematics' second single, "Break", featured a guest appearance by Chris Cain, bassist from Californian band We Are Scientists.

The track "Rise and Fall" appeared in the 2011 Hollywood box office hit What's Your Number?, starring Anna Farris, Chris Evans and Martin Freeman.

Track listing
All songs written by The Cinematics, except "Sunday Sun" written by Beck.

 "Race to the City" – 3:52
 "Break" – 4:01
 "A Strange Education" – 5:24
 "Human" – 4:27
 "Chase" – 4:14
 "Rise & Fall" – 4:50
 "Sunday Sun" – 4:02
 "Keep Forgetting" – 3:58
 "Ready Now" – 4:22
 "Maybe Someday" – 3:23
 "Alright" – 4:08
 "Asleep at the Wheel" – 6:05
 "Home" (Hidden Track) – 4:29
 "Box" (iTunes Bonus Track) – 4:15

Personnel
The Cinematics
Scott Rinning – lead vocals, guitar
Ross Bonney – drums
Ramsay Miller – lead guitar
Adam Goemans – bass guitar

Technical personnel
Stephen Hague – production
 Simon Barnicott – production
 Leonard B. Johnson - A&R

References

2007 debut albums
The Cinematics albums
Albums produced by Stephen Hague